Munsu may refer to:

 Park Mun-su, a Korean scholar
 Munsu (Blade of the Phantom Master), a comics character
 Munsu Cup Stadium, in South Korea
 Memorial University of Newfoundland Students' Union, a Canadian undergraduate student union